Benedict Arnold (October 5, 1780 – March 3, 1849) was an American politician from New York, and a member of the House of Representatives.

Biography
Arnold was born in Amsterdam, Tryon County, New York (after 1784 Montgomery County, New York) the son of Elisha and Sarah Francisco Arnold. He was named in honor of the famous Benedict Arnold at a time during the American Revolutionary War when he was still seen as a hero of the United States, stemming from the capture of Fort Ticonderoga.

Arnold attended the local schools and became a successful merchant. He married Mary 'Polly' Bovee (sister of Matthias J. Bovee) on August 21, 1806 in Amsterdam, Montogmery County, New York. They had twelve children, Hiram, Jane, William, Maria, James, Charlotte, Lorenzo, Benedict, Hasley, Sarah, Marion, and Adam.

Career
Arnold owned large stretches of land, and was able to dedicate much time to philanthropy. As was common at the time for local magnates, he entered politics for a short period; in 1816 and 1817, he served as a member of the New York State Assembly.

In 1828, Arnold was elected to the Twenty-first United States Congress as an Anti-Jacksonian to represent the sixteenth district of New York. He served from March 4, 1829 to March 3, 1831, and did not seek reelection. He was president of the board of trustees of the village of Amsterdam in 1832 and did not engage in active business pursuits, but lived in retirement in Amsterdam, New York, until his death.

Death
Arnold died in Amsterdam, Montgomery County, New York, on March 3, 1849 (age 68 years, 149 days). He is interred at Green Hill Cemetery, Amsterdam, New York.

References

External links

Benedict Arnold entry at The Political Graveyard

 

 

1780 births
1849 deaths
Members of the New York State Assembly
People from Amsterdam, New York
National Republican Party members of the United States House of Representatives from New York (state)
19th-century American politicians